Jane’s Walk is a series of neighbourhood walking tours. Named after urban activist and writer Jane Jacobs, Jane's Walks are held annually during the first weekend in May to coincide with her birthday.

Jane's Walks are led by volunteers, and are offered for free. The walks are led by anyone who has an interest in the neighbourhoods where they live, work or socialise. They are not always about architecture and heritage, and offer a more personal take on the local culture, the social history and the planning issues faced by the residents.

Since its inception in 2007, Jane’s Walk has happened in cities across North America and around the world. In 2014, over 40,000 people took part in a Jane's Walk led by volunteers in 134 cities across 6 continents.

Cities that have participated in Jane's Walk 

 Amsterdam
 Anchorage
 Ashdod
 Beer Sheva
 Belleville, Ontario
 Boston
 Burgos
 Cairo
 Calcutta
 Calgary
 Castelló
 Catania
 Chicago
 Christchurch, New Zealand
 Colchester
 Dayton
 Detroit
 Dublin
 Gatineau, Quebec
 Haifa
 Honolulu
 Halifax
 Jerusalem
 Kiel
 Kitchener
 Lethbridge
 Ljubljana
 Milwaukee
 Montreal
 Mumbai
 Madrid
 Nesher 
 New Orleans
 New York City
 Oakland
 Oklahoma City
 Olbia
 Omaha
 Orlando
 Philadelphia
 Phoenix
 Providence
 Ottawa
 Perth
 Raleigh
 Regina
 Salt Lake City
 San Francisco
 Seattle
 Singapore
 St. Louis
 Sudbury
 Tel Aviv
 Toronto
 St. John's, Newfoundland and Labrador
 Vancouver
 Victoria
 Vienna, Austria 
 Waterloo
 Windsor
 Winnipeg
 Woonsocket
 Zagreb

See also
 Urban exploration

References

External links

Jane's Walk (International)
Jane Jacobs Walk (formerly Jane's Walk USA)
2012 Flickr photo pool
(Video) Eyes on the Street - a 2011 Jane's Walk in Toronto
Manual for organizing urban strolls (in Slovene)
Jane's Walk 2013 Calcutta, India
Jane's Walk Colchester

Urban planning